Kwon Yu-ri (born December 5, 1989), better known by her mononym Yuri, is a South Korean singer, actress and songwriter. She debuted as a member of girl group Girls' Generation (and later its subgroup Girls' Generation-Oh!GG) in August 2007, which went on to become one of the best-selling artists in South Korea and one of South Korea's most popular girl groups worldwide. Apart from her group's activities, she has acted in several television dramas such as Fashion King (2012),  Local Hero (2016), Innocent Defendant (2017), Dae Jang Geum Is Watching (2018), Bossam: Steal the Fate (2021), and Good Job (2022). In 2013, she made her film debut in No Breathing. In 2018, she made her debut as a soloist with her first extended play The First Scene.

Early life
Yuri was born in Deogyang-gu, Goyang, Gyeonggi, South Korea, on December 5, 1989. She has one older brother, Kwon Hyuk-joon. She auditioned at the SM Entertainment Casting System and joined the company in 2001 after finishing in second place in the 2001 SM Youth Best Dancer Contest. She then underwent training for 5 years and 11 months before her debut. She graduated from Neunggok High School in 2008. She and Sooyoung were appointed as Chung-Ang University new ambassadors on May 20, 2014. On February 15, 2016, she graduated with a degree in Theater and Film as well as receiving a Lifetime Achievement Award as Honorary Ambassador of the school at the graduation ceremony.

Career

2007–2010: Girls' Generation debut and solo activities

Yuri made her official debut as a member of the 9-member girl group, Girls' Generation in August 2007. Aside from her group's activities, she had a small role in a television segment, The King's Boyfriend, which was part of the documentary Super Junior Show by S.M Entertainment's boy group Super Junior. She also made a cameo appearance as a ballerina in the film, Attack on the Pin-Up Boys, which also stars the members of Super Junior.

In 2008, Yuri had a recurring role in the 2008 KBS2 sitcom, Unstoppable Marriage, where she played as a high school student along with fellow member Sooyoung. In June, she sang a duet called "Kkok (Must!)" with Sooyoung for the soundtrack of SBS television series, Working Mom. Yuri also became a cast member in the second season of Kko Kko Tours Single♥Single, a dating show between celebrities.

In 2009, she was announced to be a host of MBC music program, Show! Music Core with fellow member Tiffany. In April, K.Will released the music video of "Dropping The Tears", featuring Yuri. She then
performed a special stage with him for one of his performances of the song on Show! Music Core, playing the piano in the background. At the end of the year, Yuri was cast alongside Sunny as one of the 7 girl group members, dubbed as 'G7' in the KBS2 reality variety show, Invincible Youth, for which she earned a nomination as Best Female MC at the 2010 KBS Entertainment Awards.

As Girls' Generation started preparing for their Japanese debut, their schedules became busier. Because of this, Yuri and Sunny left Invincible Youth in June 2010. For the same reason, she and Tiffany also had to leave Show! Music Core in the following month to focus on the group's activities.

Yuri made her first contribution as a songwriter for Girls' Generation's third mini album, Hoot, where she wrote the lyrics for the track, "Mistake". In September, she was featured in the track "Like A Soap", from TVXQ's sixth Korean studio album Catch Me.

2011–2014: Acting career

In October 2011, Tiffany and Yuri returned to Show! Music Core and hosted the show until January 2012 when Yuri left the show once again to focus on her drama debut.

In 2012, Yuri made her acting debut in SBS drama series Fashion King alongside actor Yoo Ah-in. Yuri received nominations at the 5th Korea Drama Awards and the 2012 SBS Drama Awards for her acting performance, and received the New Star Award at the latter on December 31.

In 2013, Girls' Generation released their fourth Korean studio album, I Got a Boy, which has two of its tracks' lyrics co-written by Yuri. "Baby Maybe" was co-written by Yuri and her fellow members Sooyoung and Seohyun, while "XYZ" was penned with Seohyun. In June, she appeared alongside Hyoyeon in Mnet's global dance survival show, Dancing 9. The two coached the show's contestants as "K-pop dance masters" along with other notable stars who also appeared as dance masters in their specific fields.

Yuri made her film debut in the same year, when she was cast as the female lead in South Korea's first swimming-themed film, No Breathing. In the coming-of-age film, Yuri portrayed the role of Jung-eun, a girl who dreams of becoming a musician who is also the love interest of the two male leads played by Lee Jong-suk and Seo In-guk. Aside from learning how to play the guitar for her character, Yuri also sang two songs for the film's soundtrack, "Bling Star" and "Twinkle Twinkle" which she performed in the film.

In October 2014, she acted as a couple with Lee Ji-hoon in the music video of "Without You" by S, which is the group's comeback single after 11 years.

2015–2017: Variety shows and return to acting
In January 2015, Yuri joined MBC's variety show, Animals, becoming the only female member of the cast. Yuri was also a guest on the programs Star With Two Job and Dating Alone. In May, Yuri was chosen to host Olive TV's travel program MAPS with Choi Kang-hee. She also joined the cast of Our Neighborhood Arts and Physical Education for its swimming special, showing off her swimming skills for the first time. On July 23, it was revealed that Yuri was cast as a host in an SBS reality show about rally drivers called The Rallyist alongside announcer Bae Sung-jae.

Yuri returned to acting in January 2016, playing the female lead in the OCN spy thriller, Local Hero. She also joined the new cast of SBS' reality-documentary show Law of the Jungle for its new season which was filmed in New Caledonia. The first episode of the show aired on July 2, 2016. In July 2016, Yuri starred as the female lead alongside Kim Young-kwang in the web drama Gogh, The Starry Night In August 2016, Yuri released a single titled "Secret" with fellow member Seohyun as part of SM Station.

In January 2017, she starred in the SBS' drama Innocent Defendant and played a lawyer for which she was nominated for an Excellence Award in the Actress in a Monday-Tuesday Drama category at the 2017 SBS Drama Awards.

2018–present: Acting activities and solo debut with The First Scene
In 2018, Yuri was cast in the second season of the sitcom, The Sound of Your Heart as the female lead, which premiered its first season on Netflix on October 29. In January, she released a collaboration single titled "Always Find You" with DJ Raiden. She was also cast in MBC's upcoming drama Dae Jang Geum Is Watching, which premiered in October.

In August 2018, Yuri was announced to be part of Girls' Generation's second sub-group, Oh!GG, which consisted of the five members who remained under SM Entertainment; the group released their first single, "Lil' Touch", in September.

Yuri released her six-track debut EP, The First Scene, on October 4, 2018, with the lead single "Into You". The album debuted at number two on the Gaon Album Chart and charted at number 10 on Billboards World Albums chart in its first week with only one day to garner points to enter it. Yuri performed "Into You" on South Korea's music shows and her promotions for the album allowed her to top the Brand Reputation rankings for individual girl group members published by the Korean Corporate Reputation Research Institute for the month of October.

Starting in November, Yuri appeared in the Channel A variety show, Makgeolli on the Rooftop, during which she and other celebrities learned how to brew makgeolli, a traditional Korean rice wine. In January 2019, she was cast in her first stage play, Grandpa Henry and Me ("L'Étudiante et Monsieur Henri"), which is a Korean version of the 2012 French play by Ivan Calbérac.

On August 26, 2020, Yuri joined Bossam: Steal the Fate as the female lead.

On May 1, 2021, Hyoyeon and Yuri make appearance on tvN's Amazing Saturday.

In September 2021, Kwon was confirmed to join the independent film Dolphin, making a comeback to the big screen since 2015.

Discography

Extended plays

Singles

Filmography

Film

Television series

Web series

Television shows

Web show

Hosting

Radio shows

Theater

Tours

Into Yuri Tour (2019)

Ambassadorship
 Ambassador of Korean Liquor Festival (2019–2022)

Awards and nominations

Notes

References

External links

   
 
 

1989 births
Living people
Chung-Ang University alumni
Girls' Generation members
Japanese-language singers of South Korea
Mandarin-language singers of South Korea
People from Goyang
SM Entertainment artists
South Korean female idols
South Korean women pop singers
South Korean film actresses
South Korean television actresses
South Korean web series actresses